Hedana is a genus of crab spiders that was first described by Ludwig Carl Christian Koch in 1874.

Species
 it contains ten widely distributed species:
Hedana bonneti Chrysanthus, 1964 – New Guinea
Hedana gracilis L. Koch, 1874 (type) – Australia (New South Wales)
Hedana maculosa Hogg, 1896 – Central Australia
Hedana morgani (Simon, 1885) – Malaysia
Hedana ocellata Thorell, 1890 – Sri Lanka, Myanmar, Indonesia (Sumatra, Java)
Hedana octoperlata Simon, 1895 – Venezuela
Hedana pallida L. Koch, 1876 – Tonga
Hedana perspicax Thorell, 1890 – Myanmar, Indonesia (Sumatra, Java)
Hedana subtilis L. Koch, 1874 – Tonga
Hedana valida L. Koch, 1875 – Australia

See also
 List of Thomisidae species

References

Further reading

Araneomorphae genera
Spiders of Africa
Spiders of Asia
Spiders of Australia
Spiders of South America
Taxa named by Carl Ludwig Koch
Thomisidae